Tim McCann may refer to:

Tim McCann (American football) (born 1947), American football player
Tim McCann (director) (born 1965), American film director
Timothy J. McCann (1944–2022), British archivist